Shahid Sadr Metro Station is a station of Tehran Metro Line 1. It is located at Sadr Expressway and Shariati Street intersection. The neighboring stations are Gholhak and Gheytariyeh.

Facilities 
The station has a ticket office, escalators, cash machine, taxi stand, pay phone, water fountains, and a lost and found.

References 

Tehran Metro stations